Intercorrupted is the fifth studio album issued by American alternative metal band Ra. released on March 19, 2021. "Intercorrupted" was released as a single on October 30, 2020 and "Jezebel" was released as second single on March 5, 2021.

Track listing

Personnel 

 Ra

 Sahaj Ticotin – lead vocals, guitar, production
 Ben Carroll – guitar, backing vocals
 P.J. Farley – bass, backing vocals
 Skoota Warner – drums

 Additional

 Dustin Bates – additional vocals on "Enough"
 Lajon Witherspoon – additional vocals on "Nobody Loves You"

References 

2021 albums
Ra (American band) albums